The 1959 Chicago White Sox season was the team's 59th season in the major leagues, and its 60th season overall. They finished with a record of 94–60, good enough to win the American League (AL) championship, five games ahead of the second place Cleveland Indians.

Offseason 
 December 1, 1958: 1958 rule 5 draft
 Claude Raymond was drafted by the White Sox from the Milwaukee Braves.
 Lou Skizas was drafted by the White Sox from the Detroit Tigers.

Regular season 
In 1959, the team won its first pennant in 40 years, thanks to the efforts of several eventual Hall of Famers – manager Al López, Luis Aparicio, Nellie Fox (the league MVP), and pitcher Early Wynn, who won the Cy Young Award at a time when only one award was presented for both leagues. Veteran catcher Sherm Lollar provided quiet leadership on and off the field, leading the team in home runs and RBIs. The White Sox also acquired slugger Ted Kluszewski in August, a local area native, from the Pittsburgh Pirates for the final pennant push. Kluszewski gave the team the needed power-hitting for the stretch run and hit nearly .300 in the final month of play for the White Sox.

After the pennant-clinching victory, Chicago Mayor Richard J. Daley, a lifelong White Sox fan, ordered his fire chief to set off the city's air raid sirens. Many Chicagoans became fearful and confused since 1959 was the height of the Cold War; however, they relaxed somewhat upon realizing it was part of the White Sox' celebration. The Sox won Game 1 of the World Series 11–0 on the strength of Kluszewski's two home runs, their last postseason home win until 2005. The Los Angeles Dodgers, however, won three of the next four games and captured their first World Series championship since moving to the west coast in 1958. 92,706 fans witnessed Game 5 of the World Series at the Los Angeles Memorial Coliseum, the most ever to attend a World Series game, or for that matter any non-exhibition major league baseball game. The White Sox won that game 1–0 over the Dodgers' 23-year-old pitcher Sandy Koufax, but the Dodgers clinched the series by beating the Sox 9–3 two days later at Comiskey Park.

Fox became the last player in the 20th century to have five hits on Opening Day.

Season standings

Record vs. opponents

Notable transactions 
 May 1, 1959: Lou Skizas and Don Rudolph were traded by the White Sox to the Cincinnati Redlegs for Del Ennis.
 May 2, 1959: Ray Boone was traded by the White Sox to the Kansas City Athletics for Harry Simpson.
 May 11, 1959: Claude Raymond was returned by the White Sox to the Milwaukee Braves.
 August 25, 1959: Ted Kluszewski was traded to the White Sox from Pittsburgh for outfielder Harry Simpson and minor league pitcher Bob Sagers.

Opening Day lineup 
 Luis Aparicio, SS
 Nellie Fox, 2B
 Jim Landis, CF
 Sherm Lollar, C
 Norm Cash, 1B
 Al Smith, RF
 Johnny Callison, LF
 Bubba Phillips, 3B
 Billy Pierce, P

Roster

Player stats

Batting 
Note: G = Games played; AB = At bats; R = Runs scored; H = Hits; 2B = Doubles; 3B = Triples; HR = Home runs; RBI = Runs batted in; BB = Base on balls; SO = Strikeouts; AVG = Batting average; SB = Stolen bases

Pitching 
Note: W = Wins; L = Losses; ERA = Earned run average; G = Games pitched; GS = Games started; SV = Saves; IP = Innings pitched; H = Hits allowed; R = Runs allowed; ER = Earned runs allowed; HR = Home runs allowed; BB = Walks allowed; K = Strikeouts

1959 World Series 

NL Los Angeles Dodgers (4) vs. AL Chicago White Sox (2)

Awards and honors 
 Nellie Fox, American League MVP. Luis Aparicio, second place in MVP voting.
 Early Wynn, Cy Young Award
 Nellie Fox, Gold Glove Award
 Luis Aparicio, Gold Glove Award
 Sherm Lollar, Gold Glove Award
 Al López, Associated Press AL Manager of the Year

Farm system

Notes

References 
 1959 Chicago White Sox at Baseball Reference

Chicago White Sox seasons
Chicago White Sox season
American League champion seasons
Chicago White